The Slaughter House (or Slaughterhouse) Covered Bridge is a wooden covered bridge that carries Slaughterhouse Road across the Dog River in Northfield, Vermont.  The Queen post truss bridge is one of five surviving 19th-century bridges in the town.  It was listed on the National Register of Historic Places in 1974.

Description and history
The Slaughterhouse Bridge is located just outside the village of Northfield Falls, a short way west of Vermont Route 12 on Slaughterhouse Road, a dead-end road that once provided access to an eponymous business. The Dog River, a tributary of the Winooski River, flows north, with the village mainly on the east side. The bridge is a single-span Queen post truss design, resting on dry laid stone abutments. The exterior is clad in vertical board siding, which extends around to the insides of the portals. The siding ends short of the roof, providing an open strip between them. The projecting gable ends are cut in the shape of a reverse ogee.

The bridge was built in 1872.  It is one of five surviving 19th-century covered bridges in the town, representing one of the highest concentration of these historic structures in the state.  There are no documents to verify, but the 8-ton weight limit seems to indicate that the deck has been reinforced by -beams, likely in the 20th century.

See also
 
 
 
 
 List of covered bridges in Vermont
 National Register of Historic Places listings in Washington County, Vermont
 List of bridges on the National Register of Historic Places in Vermont

References

External links

Buildings and structures in Northfield, Vermont
Bridges completed in 1872
Covered bridges on the National Register of Historic Places in Vermont
Queen post truss bridges in the United States
Wooden bridges in Vermont
Covered bridges in Washington County, Vermont
National Register of Historic Places in Washington County, Vermont
Road bridges on the National Register of Historic Places in Vermont
1872 establishments in Vermont